Swope Memorial Golf Course is a golf course that was founded in 1934 and previously designed by golf course architect A. W. Tillinghast. It hosted the 1949 Kansas City Open Invitational, a PGA Tour event at the time and is the only golf course in the Kansas City area to have done so.

In 1953 Swope hosted the United Golf Association (UGA) National Championship, in which Ann Gregory and Charlie Sifford won the women's and men's divisions, respectively.

Course layout

External links
Swope Memorial Golf Course

References

Sports venues in Kansas City, Missouri
Golf clubs and courses in Missouri
Sports in the Kansas City metropolitan area
1934 establishments in Missouri